The Currents of Space  is a science fiction novel by the American writer Isaac Asimov, published in 1952. It is the second (by internal series chronology) of three books labeled the Galactic Empire series, but it was the last of the three to be written. Each occurs after humans have settled many worlds in the galaxy, after the second wave of colonization that went beyond the Spacer worlds, and before the era of decline that was the setting for the original Foundation series.

Asimov stated in 1988 in the "Author's Note" to Prelude to Foundation that book #6 in the Foundation universe chronology was The Currents of Space (1952) and that it was "the first of my Empire novels." Book #7 was The Stars, Like Dust (1951), which was "the second Empire novel."

Plot summary
The story takes place in the context of Trantor's rise from a large regional power to a galaxy-wide empire, unifying millions of worlds. The approximate date is around the year 11,000 AD (originally 34,500 AD, according to Asimov's early 1950s chronology), when the Trantorian Empire encompasses roughly half of the galaxy.

The independent planet Sark rules, and exploits, the planet Florina which orbits the star located nearest to Sark's sun.  Sark derives great wealth from kyrt, a natural plant fiber which is extraordinarily useful and versatile, but which cannot be grown on Sark or on any planet other than Florina. The relationship between the two planets is analogous to the situation between European imperial powers and their colonies during the 19th century: native Florinians are forced to work in kyrt fields and are treated as an inferior race by the resident Sarkites. They are also lighter-skinned than most humans on other worlds, but this is no longer viewed as significant.  Memories of racism on Earth have been lost.

Attempts to break the Sark monopoly and grow kyrt on worlds other than Florina have so far been unsuccessful, because kyrt plants grown on other planets do not produce kyrt, only a useless, inferior form of cellulose; no one understands why. So Sark's wealth depends on its colonial dominance of Florina. The government of Trantor naturally wishes to add the two worlds to its growing empire.

The action centers around Rik, a man suffering from gross amnesia and apparent feeble-mindedness. When Rik gradually starts remembering his past, a political crisis involving Sark, Florina, and Trantor ensues.  Rik must dodge planetary law-enforcement agents and interstellar spies as he attempts to learn his own history and identity, which the government of Sark is trying to prevent. Ultimately he learns that before losing his memory he was a "spacio-analyst": a specialized astronaut who gathers samples of the very sparse interstellar gasses in outer space, and determines their composition.  (The spacio-analysts' slogan is "We analyze Nothing".) He also finds out that he had discovered that Florina's sun is about to explode into a nova because it is being exposed to a stream of isolated gaseous carbon atoms flowing through its region of space. The carbon atoms, besides causing Florina's sun to approach nova-stage, are also the reason kyrt grows on Florina: they are causing Florina's sun to emit a special energetic wavelength of light which kyrt plants need in order to bio-synthesize the kyrt fiber. Streams of carbon atoms ("carbon currents") are very rare in space; the reason the plants do not make kyrt when grown on planets orbiting other stars is that Florina is the only known habitable planet whose sun is located in the path of a carbon current.

Because losing Florina would mean losing the principal source of Sark's vast wealth, there was strong resistance from the government of Sark to accept Rik's finding; his amnesia was caused by the government's misuse of a mind-altering device called a "psychic probe" in an attempt to suppress his message. However, once Rik recovers his memory and reveals the effect of the carbon atoms, the conditions that enable kyrt to grow can be easily duplicated anywhere now that they are understood.

Rik also learns that he was born on the planet Earth, which is now radioactive.  He suggests that Earth was the planet where humanity first originated, but this hypothesis remains controversial.

Science
When Asimov wrote the book, the cause of novae was unknown.  There are real 'currents of space', but they have nothing to do with the matter.

Reception
Galaxy reviewer Groff Conklin described the novel as "one of Asimov's lesser efforts, but still considerably above the average space opera". The magazine's Floyd C. Gale told readers "Don't miss" it and the other Empire novels. Anthony Boucher and J. Francis McComas found The Currents of Space an advance from Asimov's previous work and described it as "first-rate entertainment [that] is so much more adroitly plotted than Asimov's previous ventures in this vein that it stands up as an intricate and constantly surprising spy-suspense story."

Footnotes

Sources

External links
 
 

1952 American novels
1952 science fiction novels
American science fiction novels
Doubleday (publisher) books
Foundation universe books
Fiction about novae
Science fiction novels by Isaac Asimov
Fiction set in the 7th millennium or beyond